The Christmas Collection is a Christmas compilation album released by American pop and Christian singer Amy Grant in 2008.

According to Amy Grant's official website,

Album information
The compilation includes fourteen previously released Christmas songs from Grant's three Christmas studio albums, A Christmas Album, Home for Christmas, and A Christmas to Remember, as well as four new songs.

Of the four new tracks, two are cover songs and two are original compositions. The two covers are "Jingle Bells" and "Count Your Blessings". The latter is taken from the 1954 jukebox musical film White Christmas, and even though Grant has stated she has not watched it yet, she recorded the song for its message. The version of "Jingle Bells" is a cover of the fast-paced arrangement written by Marty Paich and originally recorded by Barbra Streisand.  The two new original compositions are "I Need a Silent Night", co-written with constant collaborator Chris Eaton ("Breath of Heaven"); and "Baby, It's Christmas", co-written with husband and fellow singer Vince Gill.

Track listing
The album contains a shortened version of "A Mighty Fortress / Angels We Have Heard on High". The intro of "Sleigh Ride" actually begins over the end of "Baby, It's Christmas", and continues non-stop in a successive flow.

Personnel 
Music credits (Tracks 1, 3, 5 & 7)
 Amy Grant – lead vocals 
 Michael Omartian – acoustic piano (3)
 Blair Masters – keyboards (3)
 Pete Wasner – keyboards (3)
 John Hobbs – acoustic piano (5)
 Tom Bukovac – guitars (1, 3)
 Ilya Toshinsky – guitars (1, 3)
 Vince Gill – guitars (5)
 Craig Nelson – bass (1, 5)
 Michael Rhodes – bass (3)
 Paul Leim – drums (1, 5)
 Chad Cromwell – drums (3)
 Jack Gold – arrangements (1)
 Marty Paich – arrangements (1)
 Carl Marsh – orchestral arrangements (1, 7)
 Shane Keister – orchestral arrangements (5)
 Isobel Griffiths – orchestra contractor (1, 5, 7)
 The London Session Orchestra – orchestra (1, 5, 7)
 Mike Casteel – music preparation (1, 5, 7)
 Eberhard Ramm – music preparation (1, 5, 7)
 Tim Davis – backing vocals (1), BGV arrangements (1)
 Lisa Cochran – backing vocals (1)
 Mark Ivey – backing vocals (1)
 Aimee Joy Weimer – backing vocals (1)
 Corrina Gill – Bible verse recitation (3)

Production 
 Brown Bannister – producer (1-8, 10-14, 16, 17, 18)
 Amy Grant – co-producer (1, 3, 5, 7), executive producer 
 Ronn Huff – co-producer (2, 11)
 Michael Omartian – producer (9, 15)
 Michael Blanton – executive producer 
 Doug Sax – mastering 
 Sangwook Nam – mastering assistant 
 Mastered at The Mastering Lab (Ojai, California).

Production and Technical credits (Tracks 1, 3, 5 & 7)
 Steve Bishir – recording, mixing, orchestra recording 
 Matt Coles – recording assistant, mix assistant 
 Brown Bannister – additional engineer 
 Billy Whittington – additional engineer 
 Traci Sterling Bishir – production manager 
 Recorded at The Sound Kitchen (Franklin, Tennessee) and Townsend Sound Studios (Nashville, Tennessee).
 Orchestra recorded at Abbey Road Studio One (London, UK).

Charts

Weekly charts

End of year charts

References

 Amy Grant Christmas Collection
 Track listing on Amy's site

Amy Grant compilation albums
Christmas compilation albums
2008 greatest hits albums
2008 Christmas albums
Christmas albums by American artists
Gospel Christmas albums
Capitol Records compilation albums
Sparrow Records compilation albums